The 2016 European Road Cycling Championships was the 22nd running of the European Road Cycling Championships, that took place over 14–18 September 2016 in Plumelec, France. The event consisted of a total of 5 road races and 5 time trials, regulated by the Union Européenne de Cyclisme (UEC). The 2016 championships were the first to be run with elite events for riders over 23 years of age, although the women's under-23 events were combined with the women's elite events.

Relocation of the championships
Initially the championships were planned to be held in Nice, France. However, on 5 August, three weeks after the Bastille Day terrorist attack there, mayor Philippe Pradal cancelled their hosting of the event, stating that the championships would require a large police presence which had not yet been guaranteed to him. The Union Européenne de Cyclisme (UEC) further explained that the "huge security presence" could not be guaranteed in Nice due to "the significant constraints".

The European Cycling Union received several new applications: from Yorkshire in the United Kingdom, Trentino and the Marche region in Italy and the French application of the Plumelec-Morbihan department within the French Brittany region. On 13 August, it was announced that the championships would be held in Plumelec-Morbihan.

Schedule

Individual time trial

Road race

Courses

Time trial 
All the starts were held on the Rue du Canal in Josselin apart from the junior women, who started on the Place de l'église in Plumelec. The elite women, men's under-23 and men's junior races were held over the same course.

Road race 
All road races took place on a  circuit, that were completed a varying number of times. The circuit was the same as the one held for the Grand Prix de Plumelec.

Events summary

Medal table

Broadcasting
 Belgium: Eén
 Denmark: TV2 Sport
 France: France 3, Eurosport France
 Norway: NRK2, NRK2, NRK1
 Europe (54 countries): Eurosport International, Eurosport Player
 United Kingdom: Eurosport UK
 Asia (17 countries): Eurosport Asia
 Netherlands: NPO 1

References

External links

 

 
European Road Championships, 2016
European Road
Road
European Road Championships by year
International cycle races hosted by France
Sport in Morbihan
September 2016 sports events in Europe